Charalampos Pavlidis (born 6 May 1991) is a Greek professional footballer who plays as an attacking midfielder for Super League 2 club Proodeftiki.

Club career
Charalampos started his professional career in Veria. He official debuted with Veria in 2008-2009 season. He also spent six months on loan in Eordaikos where he performed in ten matches, scoring two goals. In January 2012, Niki Volos signed on loan for six months Charalampos, where he played in twenty matches and scored four goals. On 14 July 2015, Pavlidis signed a new contract with Veria. His new contract is set to expire on 30 June 2018.

Aris
On 11 September 2015, he joined Gamma Ethniki club Aris. On 21 July 2016, he renewed his contract for two more seasons.

On 3 July 2018, after a fantastic season, in which Aris managed to secure promotion to the Superleague after four years of absence, Pavlidis agreed to a three-year contract extension.

On 12 June 2019, he terminated his contract with the club by mutual consent.

Apollon Smyrnis
On 26 June 2019, he joined Apollon Smyrnis on a free transfer.

References

External links

1991 births
Footballers from Veria
Living people
Aris Thessaloniki F.C. players
Veria F.C. players
Association football midfielders
Greek footballers